The 1980 NCAA Men's Division II Ice Hockey Tournament involved 4 schools playing in single-elimination play to determine the national champion of men's NCAA Division II college ice hockey.  A total of 4 games were played, hosted by Elmira College.

Mankato State, coached by Don Brose, won the national title with a 5-2 victory in the final game over Elmira.

Steve Carroll, of Mankato State, was named the Most Outstanding Player and Mike Carr, of the University of Lowell, was the high scorer of the tournament with six points (3 goals, 3 assists).

Qualifying teams
Due to the lack of conferences and tournaments for western schools the NCAA held a regional tournament to help select teams for the national tournament. The western regional tournament is not considered as part of the NCAA championship but is included here for reference. No automatic bids were offered.

Western Regional Tournament

National Tournament Teams

Bracket

Note: * denotes overtime period(s)

All-Tournament team

G: Steve Carroll (Mankato State)
D: Mike Weinkauf (Mankato State)
D: Chuck Blomquist (Elmira)
F: Steve Forliti (Mankato State)
F: Tom Tidman (University of Lowell)
F: Dave Drew (Elmira)
C: Jeff Cristina (Elmira)

External links

NCAA men's ice hockey championship
 
NCAA Men's Division II Ice Hockey Tournament
NCAA Division II men's ice hockey tournament